The Father of a Murderer is the last narrative written by German author Alfred Andersch. It was published in 1980, the year that Andersch died, and describes a 1928 school lesson attended by grammar school student Franz Kien. The story is considered to be partly autobiographical. The protagonist is Joseph Gebhard Himmler, the father of Heinrich Himmler. Joseph Gebhard Himmler had been Andersch's schoolmaster.

An English translation of Andersch's German original was published in 1994.
 The Father of a Murderer, New Directions, 

1980 German novels
German autobiographical novels
Fiction set in 1928
Novels set in Germany